Mario Livio (born June 19, 1945) is an Israeli-American astrophysicist and an author of works that popularize science and mathematics. For 24 years (1991–2015) he was an astrophysicist at the Space Telescope Science Institute, which operates the Hubble Space Telescope. He has published more than 400 scientific articles on topics including cosmology, supernova explosions, black holes, extrasolar planets, and the emergence of life in the universe. His book on the irrational number phi, The Golden Ratio: The Story of Phi, the World's Most Astonishing Number (2002), won the Peano Prize and the International Pythagoras Prize for popular books on mathematics.

Scientific career

Livio earned a Bachelor of Science degree in physics and mathematics at the Hebrew University of Jerusalem, a Master of Science degree in theoretical particle physics at the Weizmann Institute, and a Ph.D. in theoretical astrophysics at Tel Aviv University. He was a professor of physics at the Technion – Israel Institute of Technology from 1981 to 1991, before moving to the Space Telescope Science Institute.

Livio has focused much of his research on supernova explosions and their use in determining the rate of expansion of the universe. He has also studied so-called dark energy, black holes, and the formation of planetary systems around young stars. He has contributed to hundreds of papers in peer-reviewed journals on astrophysics. Among his prominent contributions, he has authored and co-authored important papers on topics related to accretion onto compact objects (white dwarfs, neutron stars, and black holes). In 1980, he published one of the very first multi-dimensional numerical simulations of the collapse of a massive star and a supernova explosion. He was one of the pioneers in the study of common envelope evolution of binary stars, and he applied the results to the shaping of planetary nebulae as well as to the progenitors of Type Ia supernovae. Together with D. Eichler, T. Piran, and D. Schramm he published a seminal paper in which the authors predicted that merging neutron stars produce Gamma-Ray bursts, gravitational waves, and certain heavy elements. All of these predictions have later been confirmed.

In 2009, the American Association for the Advancement of Science (AAAS) Council elected him as a Fellow of the AAAS. Livio was cited for his "distinguished contributions to astrophysics through research on stars and galaxies and through communicating and interpreting science and mathematics to the public." He is also cited in the American Men and Women of Science.

Since 2010, Livio has mainly concentrated on the problem of the emergence of life in the universe. In this context, he co-authored (primarily with Rebecca G. Martin) a series of works related to life on Earth and life's potential emergence on extrasolar planets. In addition, in 2015 he reviewed the scientific achievements of the Hubble Space Telescope in its first 25 years in operation.

Livio has been nominated three times by the USA Science and Engineering Festival as one of the "Nifty Fifty Speakers" to talk about his work and career to middle and high school students in 2010, 2011, and 2013. Other honors include: Carnegie Centenary Professor in 2003, Danz Distinguished Lecturer in 2006, Resnick Distinguished Lecturer in 2006, Iben Distinguished Lecturer in 2008, and Terzian Distinguished Lecturer in 2011.

Popular works

Livio has popularized astronomy and mathematics through books, lectures, magazine articles, and radio and television appearances. He has appeared on TV and radio outlets including PBS, NPR, and CBS to discuss scientific and mathematical subjects. Livio's first book of popular science was The Accelerating Universe (2000), which described the theory that the universe was expanding at a faster and faster rate. He explored the possible causes and the theoretical implications of continuing expansion, especially its implications for beliefs about the "beauty" of the scientific laws that govern the cosmos.

Livio's next book, The Golden Ratio: The Story of Phi (2002), concerned patterns in nature and art. He traced the influence of the golden ratio through many centuries of art, architecture, music, and even stock market theories.

The Equation That Couldn't Be Solved (2005) described how efforts to solve the quintic equation led to group theory and to the mathematics of symmetry. He emphasizes the crucial roles of Évariste Galois and Niels Henrik Abel in developing this branch of mathematics. The book contains biographical sketches of Galois, Abel, and several other mathematicians.

Is God A Mathematician? (2009) discusses the ability of mathematics to describe and predict accurately the physical world. Livio also attempts to answer a question with which mathematicians and philosophers have struggled for centuries: Is mathematics ultimately invented or discovered? The book was selected by the Washington Post as one of the best books of 2009.

Brilliant Blunders (2013) investigates serious mistakes by five notable figures in science: Charles Darwin, Lord Kelvin, Linus Pauling, Fred Hoyle, and Albert Einstein.

Why? What Makes Us Curious (2017) explores the nature of human curiosity, focusing on Leonardo da Vinci and Richard Feynman.

Galileo and the Science Deniers (2020) seeks to place Galileo Galilei's life and discoveries in modern scientific and social contexts, and draws a parallel between modern science denialism and the heresy charges against Galileo.

Personal life 

Livio was born in Bucharest in Romania, and lived with his grandparents when his mother and father were forced to flee the country for political reasons. He left Romania at age five with his grandparents, and the family settled in Israel. He served as a paramedic with the Israeli Defense Forces in the 1967 Six-Day War, the 1973 Yom Kippur War, and the 1982 Lebanon War.

Livio and his wife Sofie, a microbiologist, have three children.

Books 

 
 
 
 
 
 
 Galileo and the Science Deniers. Simon and Schuster. 2020. ISBN 978-1501194733

Lectures, a selection

References

External links
 
  to the International Mars Society Convention, University of Maryland, 2009
 
 

1945 births
Living people
Fellows of the American Association for the Advancement of Science
Romanian astronomers
Israeli astronomers
Israeli science writers
Israeli scientists
Romanian Jews
Romanian emigrants to Israel
Academic staff of Technion – Israel Institute of Technology
Hebrew University of Jerusalem alumni
Weizmann Institute of Science alumni
Tel Aviv University alumni
Mathematics popularizers